Hans Theessink (born 5 April 1948, Enschede, Netherlands) is a Dutch guitarist, mandolinist, singer and songwriter, living in Vienna, Austria.  He performs blues and roots music, particularly in a Delta blues style. He is a bass-baritone. Theessink has released 20 albums, a songbook, a blues-guitar instruction video and a DVD.

In 2012, he released Delta Time (2012), performed with Terry Evans and featuring Ry Cooder.

In 2013, he released Wishing Well, which he described as a retrospective album looking back at many of his favorite moments in his music career. The album also features several originals, including "House Up On The Hill," which he described as a song about flooding in Mississippi. Hans has said he was partly inspired by observing floods in his home country of The Netherlands during his childhood.

References

External links
 Hans Theessink official website
 Hans Theessink myspace site
  London gig review October 2007 

1948 births
Living people
Blues guitarists
People from Enschede
Dutch guitarists
Dutch male guitarists
Dutch blues mandolinists
Blues mandolinists
Vienna Art Orchestra members
Ruf Records artists